Mikhail, or Hamud Bey, from the House of Shervashidze, or Chachba (died 1866) was the head of state of the Principality of Abkhazia and reigned from 1823 to 1864.

Mikhail, who was Orthodox Christian, came to power at a time when Abkhazia had only recently been declared a protectorate of Russia, as a result of the 1810 manifesto of Tsar Alexander I. During the Crimean War of 1853–55, Abkhazia was invaded by Turkey, and Mikhail was forced to declare his loyalty to Turkey. This came back to haunt him when, in 1864, the Russians accused him of cooperating with Turkey during the war. He was subsequently exiled to Voronezh, in Russia – an act which was vastly unpopular with the Abkhaz people.

Mikhail's deportation, and death not long after, also marked the beginning of the end for Abkhazian self-governance for the next 140 years. In June 1864, the Princedom was abolished and replaced by the Sukhumi Military Sector. In 1866, a popular uprising declared Mikhail's son Giorgi Prince, but this was short-lived.

Ancestry

See also 
Russification

References

Lak'oba, S. (1999). 18th century-1917 in The Abkhazians; a handbook. Curzon Press, Richmond (England).

External links

Abkhazia, Mikheil of
Princes of Abkhazia
Converts to Eastern Orthodoxy from Islam
Abkhazian former Muslims
Year of birth missing
House of Shervashidze